The Deadline Effect: How to Work Like It's the Last Minute-Before the Last Minute is a book by New York-based journalist Christopher Cox, published by Avid Reader in July 2021. Reviews of this volume have been published in many peak media including The Wall Street Journal, Financial Times, The New Yorker, and Time. Based on both academic knowledge and narratives of organizational cases, the book provides a theory for understanding the mental dynamics imposed by pending deadlines, creating a guide to master commonly associated fears, and comfortably win each deadline scenario and keep customers happy.

References

2021 non-fiction books
English-language books
Avid Reader Press books
Self-help books